The genus Tolypeutes contains the two species of three-banded armadillos. They are restricted to open and semi-open habitats in South America.

Of the several armadillo genera, only Tolypeutes rely heavily on their armor for protection. When threatened by a predator, Tolypeutes species frequently roll up into a ball. Other armadillo species cannot roll up because they have too many plates. This species is endangered due to the deforestation done in their native land of Brazil, including the hunting by the locals. Despite this defense mechanism, they lack the ability to dig burrows such as their competition in that environment; instead they will look for abandoned burrows. Deforestation is the main concern due to their downfall with digging burrows since they have nowhere to hide from predators or even locals.

Species 
There are two recognized species:

References 

http://www.msu.edu/~nixonjos/armadillo/tolypeutes.html
http://www.thewebsiteofeverything.com/animals/mammals/Xenarthra/Dasypodidae/Tolypeutes/index.html
  Melo, Siqueira, J. A., Santos, B. A., Álvares-da-Silva, O., Ceballos, G., & Bernard, E. (2014). Football and Biodiversity Conservation: FIFA and Brazil Can Still Hit a Green Goal. Biotropica, 46(3), 257–259. https://doi.org/10.1111/btp.12114
 Deem, Sharon L., et al. “Health Assessment of Free-Ranging Three-Banded (Tolypeutes Matacus) and Nine-Banded (Dasypus Novemcinctus) Armadillos in the Gran Chaco, Bolivia.” Journal of Zoo and Wildlife Medicine, vol. 40, no. 2, American Association of Zoo Veterinarians, 2009, pp. 245–56, https://doi.org/10.1638/2007-0120.1.

External links 
Video of a three-banded armadillo rolling itself into a ball

Myrmecophagous mammals
Armadillos
Mammal genera
Taxa named by Johann Karl Wilhelm Illiger